Pascal Pinard (born 10 September 1965) is a French swimmer and multiple Paralympic gold medallist.

He first represented France at the 1992 Summer Paralympics in Barcelona, winning five gold medals, a silver and two bronze. He represented France again at the 1996 Games, taking a gold, a silver and two bronze. He won three silver medals at the 2000 Summer Paralympics, and then a gold and two bronze in 2004.

Pinard was born with his left leg going no further than the knee, and no forearms.

He works as a librarian.

References

External links
 

1965 births
Living people
French male freestyle swimmers
Paralympic swimmers of France
Paralympic gold medalists for France
Paralympic silver medalists for France
Paralympic bronze medalists for France
Swimmers at the 1992 Summer Paralympics
Swimmers at the 1996 Summer Paralympics
Swimmers at the 2000 Summer Paralympics
Swimmers at the 2004 Summer Paralympics
Medalists at the 1992 Summer Paralympics
Medalists at the 1996 Summer Paralympics
Medalists at the 2000 Summer Paralympics
Medalists at the 2004 Summer Paralympics
Paralympic medalists in swimming
French male breaststroke swimmers
French male backstroke swimmers
French male medley swimmers
French male butterfly swimmers
S5-classified Paralympic swimmers
20th-century French people
21st-century French people